Kuroshiodaphne aurea  is a species of sea snail, a marine gastropod mollusk in the family Raphitomidae.

Description
The length of the shell varies between 11 mm and 14 mm.

Distribution
This marine species occurs off Mactan Island, Cebu, the Philippines.

References

 Stahlschmidt P., Poppe G.T. & Tagaro S.P. (2018). Descriptions of remarkable new turrid species from the Philippines. Visaya. 5(1): 5-64.

External links

 Worms Link

aurea